Pycnandra is a genus of trees in the family Sapotaceae described as a genus in 1876.

it is the largest endemic genus of flowering plants of New Caledonia. Its closest relative is the Australian Niemeyera.

List of species

References

 
Sapotaceae genera
Flora of New Caledonia
Endemic flora of New Caledonia
Taxonomy articles created by Polbot